Fossiomanus is an extinct genus of tritylodontid mammaliamorphs from the Early Cretaceous of China. It includes one species, F. sinensis, which is known from a single nearly complete skeleton from the Aptian Jiufotang Formation. Features of its limbs and vertebrae indicate that Fossiomanus was adapted towards a fossorial lifestyle.

Fossiomanus is the geologically youngest known tritylodontid, and as such, the last known non-mammalian synapsid. The holotype of Fossiomanus was found below a tuff layer that has been dated to 118.9 Ma. It is slightly more recent than Montirictus.

References 

Tritylodontids
Prehistoric cynodont genera
Aptian life
Early Cretaceous synapsids
Cretaceous China
Fossils of China
Jiufotang fauna
Fossil taxa described in 2021
Taxa named by Jin Meng